De cero is the debut album by Diego Gutiérrez. Its arrangements and sonority range from pop-rock and latin pop to Nueva Trova and cuban music. In 2007, it won three nominations and two Cubadisco Awards in the category of Best Album of Trova-Pop-Rock and Best Video Clip for its single En la Luna de Valencia.

Production 

De cero was recorded in the Abdala Studios (Havana, Cuba) with a small ensemble of musicians and it represented a turn over in Diego Gutiérrez ´s career, because of the way his songs were presented to the audience. The songs in the album were composed through his guitar alone and with the new arrangements his work reached a whole new level regarding musical expression, which was a pleasant surprise for his fans.

Record producer Elmer Ferrer, along with his band and that time, brought pop-rock sounds and jazz harmonies to Gutiérrez work, and an unprejudiced approach to it, which contributed to this debut album's success.

Track listing

Personnel 

Vocals, acoustic guitar: Diego Gutiérrez
Electric guitar, acoustic guitar: Elmer Ferrer
Bass: Juan Pablo Dominguez
Drums: Amhed Mitchel
Piano and keyboards: Alexis Bosch
Percussion: Francois Zayas
Trumpet: Alexander Abreu
Backing vocals: Rochy y Hakely Nakao
Record producer: Elmer Ferrer
Executive producer: Lecsy González

References

External links 

 De cero in Discogs
 De cero in RateYourMusic
 De cero in AllMusic

2007 albums
Spanish-language albums